{{Taxobox
| name = Chondrenchelys
| fossil_range = 
| image = Chondrenchelys problematica.jpg
| regnum = Animalia
| phylum = Chordata
| classis = Chondrichthyes
| ordo = Chondrenchelyiformes
| familia = Chondrenchelyidae
| genus = Chondrenchelys
| genus_authority = Traquair, 1888
| species = C. problematica| binomial = Chondrenchelys problematica| binomial_authority = Traquair, 1888
}}Chondrenchelys' is an extinct genus of cartilaginous fish and the earliest member of Holocephali known from complete skeletons. Chondrenchelys would have been quite a relatively medium-sized fish with an elongated body up to in length, it had a dorsal fin which was indeed long and a body which tapered to a point. Chondrenchelys'' had one large pair, one middle-sized pair, and three small pair of tooth plates in each jaw.

See also

 List of prehistoric cartilaginous fish

References

Prehistoric cartilaginous fish genera
Devonian cartilaginous fish
Fossils of Great Britain